Sir Thomas Roe ( 1581 – 6 November 1644) was an English diplomat of the Elizabethan and Jacobean periods. Roe's voyages ranged from Central America to India; as ambassador, he represented England in the Mughal Empire, the Ottoman Empire, and the Holy Roman Empire.  He sat in the House of Commons at various times between 1614 and 1644. Roe was an accomplished scholar and a patron of learning.

Life

Roe was born at Low Leyton near Wanstead in Essex, the son of Sir Robert Rowe of Gloucestershire and Cranford, Middlesex, and his wife Elinor Jermy, daughter of Robert Jermy of Worstead, Norfolk. He matriculated at Magdalen College, Oxford, on 6 July 1593, at the age of twelve. In 1597 he entered Middle Temple and became esquire of the body to Queen Elizabeth I of England. He was knighted by James I on 23 July 1604, and became friendly with Henry, Prince of Wales, and also with Henry's sister Elizabeth, afterwards briefly Queen of Bohemia, with whom he maintained a correspondence and whose cause he championed.

Sir Thomas Roe died in 1644 at the age of about 63. He was buried in the parish church of St. Mary in Woodford, London.

Family
Roe married Eleanor, Lady Beeston, the young widowed daughter of Sir Thomas Cave of Stanford-on-Avon, Northamptonshire in 1614, just weeks before embarking for India. Eleanor did not go to India, but did accompany Roe on the subsequent embassy to Constantinople. The couple were childless and adopted Jane Rupa, an orphaned girl introduced by Queen Elizabeth of Bohemia. When Eleanor died in 1675 she was buried alongside him in the parish church of St. Mary, Woodford.

Career

Amazon explorer

In 1610, Roe was sent by Prince Henry on a mission to the West Indies, during which he visited Guiana and the Amazon River. He tried to reach the Lake Parime location of the fabled El Dorado, that was represented in the map of Thomas Harriot in 1596. However, he failed then, and in two subsequent expeditions, to discover the gold he was seeking.

Ambassador to the Mughal Empire

In 1614, Roe was elected Member of Parliament for Tamworth.

The East India Company persuaded King James to send Roe as a royal envoy to the Agra court of the Great Mughal Emperor, Jahangir. Roe resided at Agra for three years, until 1619.  At the Mughal court, Roe allegedly became a favourite of Jahangir and may have been his drinking partner; certainly he arrived with gifts of "many crates of red wine" and explained to him "What beere was? How made?"

The immediate result of the mission was to obtain permission and protection for an East India Company factory at Surat. While no major trading privileges were conceded by Jahingir, "Roe's mission was the beginning of a Mughal-Company relationship that would develop into something approaching a partnership and see the EIC gradually drawn into the Mughal nexus".

While Roe's detailed journals are a valuable source of information on Jahangir's reign, the Emperor did not return the favour, with no mention of Roe in his own voluminous diaries.

Ambassador to the Ottoman Empire
In 1621, Roe was elected MP for Cirencester.

Roe received diplomatic credentials to the Ottoman Empire on 6 September, arriving at Constantinople in December.  In this role, he obtained an extension of the privileges of the English merchants.  He concluded a treaty with Algiers in 1624, by which he secured the liberation of several hundred English captives.  He also gained the support, by an English subsidy, of the Transylvanian Prince Gabriel Bethlen for the European Protestant alliance and the cause of the Palatinate.

Through his friendship with the Ecumenical Patriarch of Constantinople, Cyril Lucaris, the famous Codex Alexandrinus was presented to James I, and Roe himself collected several valuable manuscripts which he subsequently presented to the Bodleian Library. 29 Greek and other manuscripts, including an original copy of the synodal epistles of the council of Basle, he presented in 1628 to the Bodleian Library, after his letters of appointment had been revoked on 26 October 1627. But Roe did not leave the Porte until June 1628.  A collection of 242 coins was given by his widow, at his desire, to the Bodleian Library after his death. He also searched for Greek marbles on behalf of the Duke of Buckingham and the second Earl of Arundel.

Diplomat in the Thirty Years War
In 1629, Roe was successful in another mission undertaken, to arrange a peace between Sweden and Poland.  In so doing, he enabled Gustavus Adolphus of Sweden to intervene decisively in the Thirty Years War on the side of the Protestant German princes. Roe also negotiated treaties with Danzig and Denmark. A gold medal was struck in his honour on his return home in 1630 after attending the Diet of Regensburg.

Sponsor of Arctic exploration
In 1631, he sponsored the Arctic exploration of Luke Fox. Roes Welcome Sound was named in his honor.

English statesman and envoy
In January 1637, Roe was appointed Chancellor of the Order of the Garter, with a pension of £1200 a year.

In June 1640, Roe was made a privy councillor. In November of that year he was elected MP for Oxford University in the Long Parliament. 
He was appointed as England's ambassador to the Holy Roman Empire from 1641 to 1642. He took part in the peace conferences at Hamburg, Regensburg and Vienna, and used his influence to obtain the restoration of the Palatinate, the emperor declaring that he had "scarce ever met with an ambassador till now."

Works

 The Embassy of Sir Thomas Roe to the Court of the Great Mogul, 1615–1619, as narrated in his journal and correspondence 
His Embassy of Sir Thomas Roe to the Court of the Great Mogul, 1615-1619, as narrated in his journal and correspondence, several times printed, has been re-edited, with an introduction by William Foster, for the Hakluyt Society (1899). This is a valuable contribution to the history of India in the early 17th century.
 Negotiations in his Embassy to the Ottoman Porte, 1621–28, vol. i
Vol. i. was published in 1740, but the work was not continued. Other correspondence, consisting of letters relating to his mission to Gustavus Adolphus, was edited by SR Gardiner for the Camden Society Miscellany (1875), vol. vii., and his correspondence with Lord Carew in 1615 and 1617 by Sir F. Maclean for the same society in 1860.
 True and Faithful Relation ... concerning the Death of Sultan Osman ... (1622)
Several of his manuscripts are in the British Museum collections. Roe published a True and Faithful Relation ... concerning the Death of Sultan Osman ..., 1622; a translation from Paolo Sarpi,
 Discourse upon the Resolution taken in the Valteline (1628); and in 1613 Dr T Wright published Quatuor Colloquia, consisting of theological disputations between himself and Roe; a poem by Roe is printed in Notes and Queries, iv. Ser. v. 9.
 The Swedish Intelligencer (1632–33), including an account of the career of Gustavus Adolphus and of the Diet of Ratisbon (Regensburg), is attributed to Roe in the catalogue of the British Museum. Several of his speeches, chiefly on currency and financial questions, were also published. Two other works in manuscripts are mentioned by Wood: Compendious Relation of the Proceedings ... of the Imperial Diet at Ratisbon and Journal of Several Proceedings of the Order of the Garter.

Modern biographies 
There are two modern biographies:

References

Further reading
Foster Rhea Dulles, Eastward Ho! The First English Adventurers to the Orient: Richard Chancellor, Anthony Jenkinson, James Lancaster, William Adams, Sir Thomas Roe (John Lane, The Bodley Head, 1931)

 

1580s births
1644 deaths
People from Leyton
Alumni of Magdalen College, Oxford
Ambassadors of England
Ambassadors of England to the Mughal Empire
Ambassadors of England to the Ottoman Empire
Ambassadors of England to the Holy Roman Empire
Ambassadors of England to Poland
17th-century English people
17th-century English diplomats
English MPs 1614
English MPs 1621–1622
English MPs 1640–1648
Members of the pre-1707 Parliament of England for the University of Oxford
Chancellors of the Order of the Garter
Knights Bachelor